The Institute of Jazz Studies (IJS) is the largest and most comprehensive library and archives of jazz and jazz-related materials in the world. It is located on the fourth floor of the John Cotton Dana Library at Rutgers University–Newark in Newark, New Jersey. The archival collection contains more than 100,000 sound recordings on CDs, LPs, EPs, 78- and 75-rpm disks, and 6,000 books. It also houses over 30 instruments used by prominent jazz musicians.

In 2013, the Institute was designated a Literary Landmark by New Jersey's Center for the Book in the National Registry of the Library of Congress. It is the fifth place in New Jersey to be given this designation, after the Newark Public Library, Paterson Public Library, the Walt Whitman House and the Joyce Kilmer Tree, which is located at Rutgers University–New Brunswick.

Major collections housed in the Institute include the Jazz Oral History Project, the Mary Lou Williams collection, the Women In Jazz collection, the Benny Carter Audio collection, and the Benny Goodman Audio collection.

History
In 1952, the Institute of Jazz Studies was founded by Marshall Stearns, a jazz scholar, literature professor, and author. Stearns had a plan for a jazz institute as early as 1949, which he thought to call the "Institute of Modern American Music". It was originally located at his apartment at 108 Waverly Place in New York City. Marshall Stearns described the Institute of Jazz Studies' mission in 1953 as the following:

Stearns negotiated transfer of IJS to Rutgers University in Newark, New Jersey, in 1966. He died before the final transfer took place. In 1967 the Institute materials were moved to the Newark campus of Rutgers University in New Jersey. Charles Nanry, a sociologist, worked part-time as its administrator. It was first located in the Dana Library (1972), then moved to Bradley Hall (1975).

The Institute was formally affiliated with the John Cotton Dana Library at Rutgersin 1984. The current expanded facilities in the library opened in 1994. Over its 60 years of existence, the Institute has acquired significant collections of periodicals as well as books, records, and archival materials from several musicians, photographers, and journalists. Major collections include the personal papers of Mary Lou Williams, Victoria Spivey, Abbey Lincoln, Annie Ross, Benny Carter, and James P. Johnson.

Publications
A special column in The Record Changer jazz magazine was the initial, temporary place of publication for the Institute of Jazz Studies scholarship.

The Journal of Jazz Studies (JJS) was published from 1973 to 1979. Annual Review of Jazz Studies (ARJS) publication began in 1981 as a continuation of JJS. Today, the Journal of Jazz Studies is an open-access online journal. The online journal continues and expands upon the tradition of the original JJS/ARJS as the longest running English-language scholarly jazz journal. It is open-access and peer-reviewed.

Studies in Jazz, a monograph series with Scarecrow Press, publishes books related to jazz.

Events and scholarship
In addition to its publications, the institute also hosts Jazz from the Archives, a radio show on WBGO radio that airs every Sunday and a Jazz Research Roundtable.

Jazz Archives fellowship
Since 2012, the Institute has also hosted an annual Jazz Archives Fellowship. The fellowship is open to graduate students of library science or recent graduates with an interest in jazz or African American studies. It is supported by the Morroe Berger - Benny Carter Jazz Research Fund, an endowment established by musician Benny Carter in 1987 to provide grants to facilitate jazz research by students and scholars. The Fellowship Program is also funded by private funds.

In 2014, the fellows focused on the collection of Ismay Duvivier, a dancer, and her son George Duvivier, a bass player.

Morroe Berger–Benny Carter Jazz Research Fund
In 1987, the institute began funding up to ten grants of $1,000 each year. The fund was started by musician Benny Carter in memory of Morroe Berger. Berger was a professor of sociology at Princeton University until his death in 1981. Half of the awards are designated for students in the Rutgers–Newark Master's Program in Jazz History and Research and half are awarded to scholars from other institutions. The awards are for visiting the Institute and performing independent jazz-related research. To date, over 70 awards have been granted.

Original Board of Advisers

 Louis Armstrong
 Philip W. Barber
 Benjamin A. Botkin
 Dave Brubeck
 Dan Burley
 Al "Jazzbo" Collins
 Harold Courlander
 Stuart Davis
 Roger Pryor Dodge
 Duke Ellington
 Ralph Ellison
 Nesuhi Ertegün
 Leonard Feather
 Norman Granz
 Bill Grauer
 Maurice R. Green, M.D.
 W. C. Handy
 Melville J. Herskovits
 George Herzog
 Langston Hughes
 Willis James
 Stan Kenton
 Lester Koenig
 M. Kolinski
 Jacob Lawrence
 Paul A. McGhee
 Alan Morrison
 Edward Abbe Niles
 Pearl Primus
 David Riesman
 Curt Sachs
 Edward Seeger
 Artie Shaw
 Edmond Souchon, M.D.
 Lorenzo Dow Turner
 Clarence Williams
 Bernard Wolfe
 John Wesley Work III

References

Bibliography
 The Record Changer, July–August 1953 (special issue).
 Kerlew, Clyde, "The Institute of Jazz Studies: From Academic Orphan to National Resource," Public and Access Services Quarterly, vol. 1, no. 1, 1995, pp. 51–74.
 Wilson, John S., "Collection of Jazz Recordings and Writings Given to Rutgers," The New York Times, September 3, 1966, p. 12.

External links
 Institute of Jazz Studies
 Journal of Jazz Studies
 New Jersey Center for the Book
 Jazz Greats Digital Exhibits

Rutgers University
Libraries in New Jersey
Jazz organizations
Music archives in the United States
Jazz music education
Newark jazz
Culture of Newark, New Jersey